The 2007 National Hurling League was the 76th season of the National Hurling League, the top leagues for inter-county hurling teams, since its establishment in 1925. The fixtures were announced on 28 November 2006. The season began on 18 February 2007 and concluded on 29 April 2007.

Division 1A

Kilkenny came into the season as defending champions of the 2006 season. Dublin entered Division 1 as the promoted team.

On 29 April 2007, Waterford won the title after a 0-20 to 0-18 win over Kilkenny. It was their first league title since 1963 and their second National League title overall.

Antrim and Down were the first two teams to be relegated to Division 2 after finishing bottom of Divisions 1A and 1B respectively. Offaly were the third team to be relegated after being beaten by Limerick in a play-off. Antrim and Offaly subsequently earned reprieves and retain their Division 1 status as the proposed restructuring of the 2008 league was scrapped.

Waterford's Eoin Kelly was the Division 1 top scorer with 1-61. Limerick's Brian Murray and Kilkenny's P. J. Ryan were the top goalkeepers having kept 4 clean sheets.

Structure

A total of 12 teams contested the top division of the league, including 11 sides from the 2006 season and one promoted from the 2006 National League Division 2. On 30 April 2006, Dublin earned promotion from the 2006 National League Division 2 after a one-year absence from the top flight. They were crowned Division 2 champions after beating Kerry. They replaced Laois who were relegated to Division 2 at the end of the previous season.

The 12 teams in Division 1 were divided into two groups of six team - 1A and 1B. Each team played all the others in its group once, earning 2 points for a win and 1 for a draw. The first-placed teams in 1A and 1B advanced to the league semi-finals. The second and third-placed teams in 1A and 1B advanced to the league quarter-finals.

Division 1A table

Group stage

Division 1B

Division 1B table

Group stage

Division 1 Knockout

Relegation play-off

Quarter-finals

Semi-finals

Final

Top scorers

Overall

Single game

Clean sheets

Division 2

On 29 April 2007, Laois won the title after a 2-19 to 0-8 win over Wicklow.  It was their first league title since 1965 and their third National League Division 2 title overall.

Meath, Carlow, Armagh, Mayo and London were relegated to Division 3 as the bottom placed teams of Divisions 2A and 2B. All of these teams subsequently earned reprieves and retained their Division 2 status as the proposed restructuring of the 2008 league was scrapped.

Structure

A total of 11 teams contested the second division of the league, including 9 sides from the 2006 season and one relegated from the 2006 National League Division 1 and one promoted from the 2006 National League Division 3.

On 30 April 2006, Armagh earned promotion from the 2006 National League Division 3. They were crowned Division 3 champions after beating Longford. They replaced Roscommon who were relegated to Division 3 at the end of the previous season. On the same day, Laois were relegated from the 2006 National League Division 1. They replaced Dublin who were promoted to Division 1 at the end of the previous season.

The 11 teams in Division 2 were divided into two groups - 2A which consisted of six teams and 2B which consisted of five teams. Each team played all the others in its group once, earning 2 points for a win and 1 for a draw. The first-placed teams in 2A and 2B advanced to the league semi-finals. The second and third-placed teams in 2A and 2B advanced to the league quarter-finals.

Division 2A

Group stage

Division 2B

Group stage

Knock-out stage

Quarter-finals

Semi-finals

Final

Division 3

On 29 April 2007, Roscommon won the title after a 1-13 to 0-15 win over Sligo.

Structure

A total of 10 teams contested the third division of the league, including 9 sides from the 2006 season and one relegated from the 2006 National League Division 2. On 30 April 2006, Armagh earned promotion from the 2006 National League Division 3. They were crowned Division 3 champions after beating Longford. They replaced Roscommon who were relegated to Division 3 at the end of the previous season

The 10 teams in Division 1 were divided into two groups of five teams - 3A and 3B. Each team played all the others in its group once, earning 2 points for a win and 1 for a draw. The first-placed teams in 3A and 3B advanced to the league semi-finals. The second and third-placed teams in 3A and 3B advanced to the league quarter-finals.

The two bottom placed teams in each group contested the Division 3 Shield and advanced to the semi-finals. The winners of these two games contested the Shield final.

Division 3A

Group stage

Division 3B

Group stage

Knock-out stage

Quarter-finals

Semi-finals

Final

Shield

Semi-finals

Final

References

 
National Hurling League seasons